The PRS for Music Heritage Award is a ceremonial plaque installed in a public place to commemorate a link between a famous musician or music band and the location they performed their first live gig. The UK-wide plaque is awarded and funded by PRS for Music.

History
The PRS for Music Heritage Award was created in 2009 by PRS for Music in order to celebrate the first performances of the UK's leading bands. The inaugural award is seen as a unique scheme to celebrate UK music venues which have played a pivotal role in launching the careers of some of the country's most iconic music acts. The first Heritage Award was presented to the UK Britpop band Blur on 30 November 2009 by PRS for Music chairman Ellis Rich.

Recipients of award

References

British music awards
Awards established in 2009
Blue plaques
2009 establishments in the United Kingdom